Champoy is a Philippine comedy gag television show. The show starred Subas Herrero, Tessie Tomas, and Noel Trinidad, and featured Mitch Valdez, Cherie Gil, and Gary Lising. It aired on RPN-9 from 1980 to 1985. The show aired every Thursdays from 8:30 PM to 9:30 PM during its run.

The popular segments of the show were Mr. Boom Boom, Walang Sisihan, and Tessie Tomas spoofing the PAGASA weatherman Amado Pineda as Amanda Pineda.

Segments
Mr. Boom Boom 
Walang Sisihan

Casts

Main cast
Subas Herrero
Noel Trinidad

Supporting cast
Tessie Tomas
Cherie Gil
Gary Lising
Ronnie Lazaro
Mitch Valdes (originally known as Maya Valdes)
Don Pepot

Production
In 1985, the show was rumored to have been cancelled by RPN, which was then owned by President Ferdinand Marcos' crony, Roberto Benedicto. Some of the show's gags were allegedly not amusing to the administration.

Reception
Champoy appealed to educated Filipinos and eventually became popular with the masses; Herrero and Trinidad were later dubbed as the Laurel and Hardy of the Philippines because of this show.

Revival
It was briefly revived by ABS-CBN 2 as Executive Champoy. It was a comedy talk show rather than the gag show, which premiered in the summer of 1992 with original Champoy cast members Subas Herrero and Noel Trinidad. It would only air until 1993 due to low ratings.

The revival's guests included:

Dolphy
Whitney Tyson
Jimmy Santos
Aga Muhlach
Jolina Madgangal-Escueta
Victor Neri
Roselle Nava-Tan 
Smokey Manaloto
APO Hiking Society
Winnie Cordero
Ariel Ureta
Tito, Vic & Joey

See also
List of programs previously broadcast by Radio Philippines Network

References

Philippine television sketch shows
Philippine television sitcoms
Radio Philippines Network original programming
Philippine comedy television series
1980s Philippine television series
1980 Philippine television series debuts
1985 Philippine television series endings